Gayle and Tom Benson Stadium is a stadium in San Antonio, Texas. It is the home field for the men's and women's soccer, track and field, and American football teams of the University of the Incarnate Word. The stadium currently seats 6,000 people. It is named after Tom Benson and his wife Gayle.  Record stadium attendance of 6,498 was recorded in a game vs Houston Baptist on November 17, 2016.

History
Gayle and Tom Benson Stadium officially opened on campus on September 1, 2008. A special grand opening ceremony was held when the Bensons, along with more than 2,000 Cardinals fans and athletes declared the facility ready for action. Benson and his family long have been ardent supporters of Incarnate Word and provided the necessary funds to start up the University's football program. A San Antonian himself, Benson was the owner of professional football's New Orleans Saints until his passing in 2018.

Renovations
Benson Stadium now has permanent seating for 6,000 spectators after the 2010 addition of the north bleachers.  Atop the original south seating areas are six suites while the north side stands have two press boxes for media and game operations, including a permanent home for KUIW Internet Radio and UIWTV. In May 2018, the original Hellas Matrix artificial playing surface was replaced with FieldTurf's Classic HD surface.

Features
An eight-lane, Sport Track 300 surface track surrounds the field and is an all-weather surface in nature. Accompanying the track are also three jumping pits.

Adjoining the football field is the Benson Fieldhouse. A  facility housing a weight room, athletic training facility, locker rooms, team meeting areas and coaches offices.

Attendance records

See also
 List of NCAA Division I FCS football stadiums

References

College football venues
College soccer venues in the United States
College track and field venues in the United States
Incarnate Word Cardinals football
Incarnate Word Cardinals men's soccer
Sports venues in San Antonio
American football venues in Texas
Athletics (track and field) venues in Texas
2008 establishments in Texas
Sports venues completed in 2008